Gabriela Rodríguez Salazar (born 10 May 2005) is a Colombian footballer who plays as an attacking midfielder for América de Cali and the Colombia women's national team.

International career
Rodríguez made her international debut in a friendly againtst Ecuador on 13 April 2021. On 3 July 2022, she was called up by Nelson Abadía to represent Colombia at the 2022 Copa América Femenina. Rodríguez was also part of the U-17 team that won the of the Women's Revelations Cup in Mexico, and finished runner-up at the 2022 South American U-17 Women's Championship and 2022 FIFA U-17 Women's World Cup. She also represented the national U-20 team at the 2022 FIFA U-20 Women's World Cup.

Honours
América de Cali
Liga Femenina Profesional: 2022

Colombia U17
 FIFA U-17 Women's World Cup runner-up: 2022
 South American U-17 Women's Championship runner-up: 2022
 Women's Revelations Cup: 2022

Colombia
Copa América Femenina runner-up: 2022

Notes

References

External links

2005 births
Living people
Sportspeople from Cauca Department
Colombian women's footballers
Women's association football midfielders
Colombia women's international footballers
21st-century Colombian women
América de Cali (women) players